The Bridge Is Built is a 1965 Soviet drama film directed by Gavriil Egiazarov and Oleg Efremov.

Plot 
The film tells about the Moscow correspondent who goes to Saratov, where the construction of a highway bridge across the Volga is in progress.

Cast 
 Igor Vasilev as Sasha Malashkin
 Oleg Tabakov as Sergei Zaytsev
 Liliya Tolmacheva as Perova (as Lidiya Tolmachyova)
 Galina Volchek as Young Girl
 Yevgeny Yevstigneyev as Sinaysky
 Lyudmila Gurchenko as Zhenya
 Oleg Dal as Yulian
 Nina Doroshina as Sasha Malashkina

References

External links 
 

1965 films
1960s Russian-language films
Soviet drama films
1965 drama films